Baron Antal Andrássy de Csíkszentkirály et Krasznahorka (October 28, 1742 – November 2, 1799) was a Hungarian Jesuit who served as second Bishop of the Roman Catholic Diocese of Rozsnyó (today: Rožňava) from December 17, 1780, until his death.

Works
 Appendix subnexa censurae testamentis demonstrationis trium propositionum de poenali transitu ex religione romano-catholica ad evangelicam. Budae, 1790.
 Epistola pastoralis ad clerum suum de necessitate unius salvificae catholicae fidei.

References

External links
 Iván Nagy: Magyarország családai czimerekkel és nemzedékrendi táblákkal. I-XIII. Bp., 1857–1868
 

1742 births
1799 deaths
Hungarian nobility
18th-century Hungarian Jesuits
18th-century Roman Catholic bishops in Hungary
Antal
Jesuit bishops